Dusen Fjord or Dusén Fjord is a fjord in the NE Greenland National Park area, East Greenland.

History
The fjord was named in 1899 by Swedish Arctic explorer A.G. Nathorst during the expedition he led to Greenland. It was named after Per Dusén, who surveyed the mouth of the fjord. The exploration, however, was incomplete and the fjord would only be thoroughly surveyed years later by Lauge Koch and by the NSIU (Norges Svalbard og Ishavsundersøkelser).

Promoted by the Arctic Trading Co., towards 1928 a number of cabins were built by the shores of this fjord, where the Norwegians had their hunting areas and fishing grounds.

Geography
The Dusen Fjord is part of the Kaiser Franz Joseph Fjord system. It cuts deep into Ymer Island, almost dividing it in two, separating Gunnar Anderson Land in the north, from the southern part of the island. Its mouth opens to the east just south of the entrance of Kaiser Franz Joseph Fjord, near Foster Bay. Noa Lake is a small lake at the head of the fjord in the isthmus area.

The Vinter Islands lie east of Cape Graah, on the northern side of the fjord's mouth. Cape Wijkander is the headland on the southern side of the mouth.

See also
List of fjords of Greenland

References

External links
Den grønlandske Lods - Sejladsanvisninger Østgrønland
On the Map of King Oscar Fjord and Kaiser Franz Josef Fjord in North-Eastern Greenland
Greenland, muskoxen on Ymer Island
Fjords of Greenland